Matthew Lee Brock (born January 14, 1966) is a former American football player who played defensive end for eight seasons in the National Football League.  In 1991, he led all Green Bay Packers defensive linemen with 57 tackles.

Personal life
His father Clyde Brock also played in the National Football League and in the Canadian Football League.

External links
NFL.com player page

1966 births
Living people
Sportspeople from Ogden, Utah
American football defensive ends
American football defensive tackles
Oregon Ducks football players
Green Bay Packers players
New York Jets players
players of American football from Utah